Tus Airways is a Cypriot airline headquartered in Larnaca and based out of Larnaca International Airport. The airline was established in June 2015 and started flights from Larnaca on 14 February 2016.

History

Tus Airways was founded in June 2015 and is backed by investors from Europe and the United States. It was the first Cypriot airline to be founded after the dissolution of Cyprus Airways in 2015. Tus Airways began operations on 14 February 2016 with a Saab 340B operating from Larnaca to Tel Aviv and Haifa in Israel. In July 2016, the airline received its first Saab 2000 to increase capacity on its routes. In June 2017, the airline acquired its first jet aircraft, two Fokker 100. It subsequently bought five Fokker 70, bringing the total number of aircraft to 7. On 6 July 2018, the airline also launched its frequent flyer program “Tus & Plus”.

In September 2019, there were reports stating the airline was going to close but the previous chief executive dismissed these reports and said that the airline “is not going to close, but it’s going to change.” It has been confirmed that the name TUS Airways will remain and that the airline will resume operations in summer of 2021.

Destinations

As of March 2023, Tus Airways operates several weekly scheduled flights from Larnaca and Tel Aviv.

Fleet

As of July 2022, Tus Airways operates the following aircraft:

See also
 List of airlines of Cyprus

References

External links

 
 Cyprus Aircraft Register As At 30 June 2017, retrieved 16 July 2017 via 

Airlines of Cyprus
Airlines established in 2015
2015 establishments in Cyprus
Larnaca